is a coeducational university located in Bunkyō, Tokyo, Japan, near the University of Tokyo. Bunkyo Gakuin University was founded in April 1991 in Kamekubo, Ōimachi, Iruma, Saitama by Ishiko Shimada. In 2001, it opened the Faculty of Foreign Studies on what had been the Tokyo campus of Bunkyo Women's College (文京女子短期大学).

There is another campus located northwest of Tokyo in Fujimino, Saitama.  The university was originally called Bunkyo Women's University (文京女子大学). It was renamed Bunkyo Gakuin University in 2002 and became coeducational in 2005. The current president of Bunkyo University is Akiko Shimada.

One of the unique features of the university is its "Chat Lounge", where students can practice their conversational language skills free of charge.  Two "chat partners" staff the English facility from Monday to Friday. The Chinese Chat Lounge space, staffed by one native Chinese speaker, is located next to the English Chat Lounge space and open in the afternoon.

The university also has three student dormitories in Hongo, Nishikata, and Fujimino, a dormitory for foreign exchange students next to the Hongo campus, a junior and senior girls' high school in Komagome, Tokyo, and a kindergarten across the street from the Hongo campus.

Bunkyo Gakuin University celebrated its 85th anniversary in 2009.

Faculties 
Students may choose from these programs of study:

Foreign Languages
Business Management 
Humanities
Health Care Management (new in 2006)

Timeline 
1924  Bunkyo University founded
1991  Bunkyo Women's University founded
2002  Name changed to Bunkyo Gakuin University 
2005  Coeducational classes begin

Study abroad 
In 2003, Bunkyo Gakuin University began a study abroad exchange program with Saint John's University and the College of Saint Benedict in Minnesota (USA).  The next year, the university welcomed students from Malaysia.  Since 2006 students from Thompson Rivers University in British Columbia, Canada have been part of the exchange program.  The school also sends students to Beijing Language University, China, New Zealand, Australia, and the United Kingdom (new in 2008) for study.

External links 
Bunkyo Gakuin University Website 

Private universities and colleges in Japan
Universities and colleges in Tokyo